Kay Koplovitz (nee Smith, born April 11, 1945) is an American businesswoman, best known as the founder of the cable television channel USA Network, for which she served as chairwoman and CEO from its founding in 1977 until 1998 when it was sold for $4.5 billion. She was the first woman in the US to head a television network. She is also the author of the books Bold Women, Big Ideas: Learning to Play the High-Risk Entrepreneurial Game, and Been There, Run That. She is credited with creating the joint advertising-licensing model, which became widespread among cable television networks.

Early life and education
Kay Koplovitz was born as Kay Smith in a middle-class neighborhood of Milwaukee, Wisconsin, her mom worked in the home, and her father was a sales executive for a metal forging company. As a young child Koplovitz would always be looking for ways to make money, having an early affinity for salesmanship, her entrepreneurial spirt was being crafted, from selling Christmas cards to Girl Scout cookies, Koplovitz loved making ideas work, making money and being able to buy things she wanted.

Koplovitz graduated from the University of Wisconsin–Madison with a B.A. in communications and earned a master's degree in communications from Michigan State University.  

Between her junior and senior year Koplovitz visited England, and while on her travels saw a poster advertising a lecture on geosynchronous orbiting satellites. The then twenty year old Koplovitz was fascinated by the lecture, and later she wrote her masters thesis on satellite communications and the potential impact on governments, people, and communications.

Career

USA Networks
In 1975 Koplovitz joined Home Box Office and led the promotion of cable and satellite broadcasting of the Thrilla in Manila boxing match between Muhammad Ali and Joe Frazier. September 30th 1975 would change history forever. The timing of the sporting event would be the turning point Koplovitz would need in order to launch her idea. The live broadcast of the famous boxing match, allowed congressman and senators to see that satellites could be used for good commercial purposes and give people much joy from experiencing the live broadcasts. She subsequently founded the USA Network in 1977 as an all-sports service, known as the Madison Square Garden Sports Network (not to be confused with the New York City-area regional sports network of the same name now simply known as MSG); She led the launch of the USA Network mainly as an all-sports service in order to compete with Home Box Office. The channel was renamed the USA Network in 1980. USA later become the number one ranking cable network in primetime viewership for 13 consecutive years. The USA Network was the first cable network to rely greatly on advertising revenue. Despite creating and supervising the network, Koplovitz did not own it, but remained its President during ownership changes. Under Koplovitz's leadership, the USA Network was the number one ranking cable network in primetime broadcasting.

Under her leadership, the Sci Fi Channel was launched in 1992 and USA Network International was launched in 1994, operating in several countries. Koplovitz is also credited with creating the business model for cable networks after introducing the concept of two revenue streams: licensing and advertising. However, at USA Networks she was known for overspending on things such as television reruns, eventually became a financial problem by the late 1990s, as interest in airing new content on a more regular basis grew. Upon hiring former CBS executive Rod Perth as entertainment chief of USA Networks by 1997, Koplovitz decided to focus more on airing higher-budget miniseries content, such as Moby Dick, as well as other new shows. She also made plans to cancel the USA Network's flagship WWF programming, a move which was opposed by USA Network executive Bonnie Hammer. She served as chairman and chief executive officer of USA Networks until 9 April 1998, months after the company was sold for $4.5 billion and became a publicly listed company. Unlike previous USA Networks owners, new owner Barry Diller, who previously had some ownership stock with the USA Network when he was head of Paramount Pictures, took over Koplovitz's executive positions at USA Networks, which resulted in her resignation from the television networks she founded. This also resulted in some of Koplovitz's future plans for the network, such as the planned removal of the WWF from USA Network in May 1998, being averted, with Diller also cutting $40 million from the network's budget.

Springboard Enterprises, Springboard Growth Capital, New York Fashion Tech Lab Koplovitz & Company
In 1998, President Bill Clinton appointed Koplovitz to chair the bipartisan National Women's Business Council. This helped create a platform for her to co-found Springboard Enterprises in 2000. Springboard is a non-profit organization fostering venture capital investments in women-led high growth companies and has created about $36 billion in revenue, created over 10,000 jobs and has accelerated the growth of 850+ women led businesses since its inception.

Koplovitz also serves as head of the New York Fashion Tech Lab, which she co-founded in 2014 in hopes of bringing promising technology companies in collaboration with the fashion and retail industry.

In 2016, she co-founded Springboard Growth Capital to bring growth stage investments to technology and life sciences companies emerging from Springboard Enterprises.

In 1998, Koplovitz & Company LLC was established to provide advisory services to entertainment companies, sports organizations, advertisers and distributors. It advises companies on growth strategies and the firm makes investments in early and mid-stage companies in media and technology.

Board memberships

In addition to her role as Chairman of both Springboard Enterprises and Springboard Growth Capital, Koplovitz also currently serves on the board at Athena Technology Acquisition Corp-SPAC, Accenture Ventures and at Veniam. She previously served as chairman of the board of Kate Spade (formerly Liz Claiborne), from January 2007 until May 2013. She also previously served as a board member of ION Media, CA Technologies, Time Inc., Instinet, Oracle, Nabisco and General Re, Sun New Media and a trustee emeritus of The Paley Center for Media and The International Hall of Fame.

In April 2014, Koplovitz joined the 10-member board of Time Inc., the publishing arm of Time Warner Inc. (now WarnerMedia, LLC). She remained on the board until Time Inc. was acquired by the Meredith Corporation (now Dotdash Meredith) in 2018.

Awards and honors
Koplovitz holds honorary doctorate degrees from Emerson College, St. John's University, Michigan State University and Canisius College.

Other honors and awards she has received include:
Women’s Entrepreneurship Day Pioneer Award for Finance (2016)
 The National Cable Television Association Vanguard Award for Young Leadership (1979)
 Koplovitz was selected for the inaugural 2021 Forbes 50 Over 50; made up of entrepreneurs, leaders, scientists and creators who are over the age of 50.

Personal life
Kay Koplovitz is married to private investor William C. Koplovitz, Jr.

References

External links 
 
 
 

1945 births
Businesspeople from Milwaukee
Businesspeople from New York City
Living people
NBCUniversal people
Michigan State University alumni
University of Wisconsin–Madison alumni